Porogramme is a genus of fungi in the family Polyporaceae. Originally described as a subgenus of Poria by French mycologist Narcisse Théophile Patouillard in 1899, he promoted it to generic status in 1900.

Species
Porogramme albocincta (Cooke & Massee) T.B.Gibertoni (2015)
Porogramme aurantiotingens  (Ellis & T.Macbr.) Pat. (1900)
Porogramme carneopallens  Pat. (1928)
Porogramme dussii  (Pat.) Pat. (1900)
Porogramme graphica  (Bres.) Pat. (1900)
Porogramme lateritia  (Pat.) Pat. (1900)
Porogramme richeriae  (Pat.) Pat. (1900)

References

Polyporaceae
Polyporales genera
Taxa described in 1899
Taxa named by Narcisse Théophile Patouillard